The Gelantan Dam (戈兰滩大坝) is a gravity dam on the Lixian River, bordering the counties of Honghe and Jiangcheng in Yunnan Province, China. The primary purpose of the dam is hydroelectric power generation and it supports a 390 MW power station. Construction began in 2003, the river was diverted in 2006 and the first generator was commissioned in 2007, the last two in 2008. It is the sixth dam in the Lixian River cascade.

See also

List of dams and reservoirs in China
List of major power stations in Yunnan

References

Dams in China
Hydroelectric power stations in Yunnan
Gravity dams
Dams completed in 2008
Dams on the Black River (Asia)
Roller-compacted concrete dams
Buildings and structures in Pu'er
Buildings and structures in Honghe Hani and Yi Autonomous Prefecture